
Listed below are executive orders and presidential proclamations signed by United States President Woodrow Wilson. His executive orders and presidential proclamations are also listed on WikiSource.

Executive orders

1913

1914

1915

1916

1917

1918

1919

1920

1921

Presidential proclamations

1913

1914

1915

1916

1917

1918

1919

1920

1921

References

External links 
 Woodrow Wilson's Executive Orders

 
United States federal policy